Danuta Małgorzata Dmowska-Andrzejuk (born 1 March 1982) is a Polish politician, former fencer and World Épée Champion 2005. In the years 2019-2020, she served as the Minister of Sport in the Second Cabinet of Mateusz Morawiecki.

Early life and education
In 2001, she graduated from the XLV Romuald Traugutt's Lyceum in Warsaw, Poland. She studied at the Józef Piłsudski University of Physical Education.

Sports career
Dmowska started fencing when she was ten years old. At first, she fought with foil but at the age of twelve she started training with épée. In January, 2005, she was second in the World Cup Competition in Prague. In June, 2005, she was third in the World Cup Competition in Barcelona. In October, 2005, she achieved her greatest success in her career so far, at the World Championship in Leipzig, she won the individual Gold Medal. In the final, she beat the Estonia fencer, Maarika Võsu. In November, 2005, she came second in the Fencing Masters Tournament in Levallois, Paris, losing to the 2004 Olympic silver medalist, the French fencer, Laura Flessel-Colovic. The world's top eight women fencers took part in the tournament. She took 28th place in the European Championship 2005 in Zalaegerszeg.

Dmowska was a member of the Legia Warsaw sports club. She represented Poland as a junior and as a senior. In national competitions, she has won the Polish Junior Individual National Championship, the Polish Senior Individual National Championship, the Polish Senior Team Championship, the Polish Youth Cup and the Polish Senior Cup. She has won the Polish Championship in Épée in 2004 and 2006.

Competition record

Political career
On December 5, 2019, she was appointed the Minister of Sport by the President of Poland. She was dismissed from office on October 6, 2020 due to the liquidation of a separate ministry. In the same month, she became the Prime Minister's plenipotentiary for the creation of the National Sports Center (Narodowe Centrum Sportu). In April 2021, the Minister of State Assets, Jacek Sasin, appointed her as a social advisor and chairman of the team for sports sponsorship by State Treasury companies.

Personal life
In 2007, she married a fencer Robert Andrzejuk.

References

Polish female fencers
1982 births
Living people
Fencers from Warsaw
Women government ministers of Poland
Recipients of the Gold Cross of Merit (Poland)
20th-century Polish women
21st-century Polish women